Paul Popovici or Paul Popovits (21 June 1948 – 7 April 2021) was a Romanian professional footballer who played as a left-back. He played almost all his career for two clubs, Bihor Oradea and UTA Arad. He also played four matches for Romania, making his debut in a match against Albania.

Popovici died in the morning of 7 April 2021, after he suffered a heart attack.

Notes

References

External links
 
 

1948 births
2021 deaths
Sportspeople from Oradea
Romanian footballers
Romania international footballers
Association football defenders
Stăruința Oradea players
CA Oradea players
Liga I players
Liga II players
FC Bihor Oradea players
FC UTA Arad players
Romanian football managers